Ixonanthaceae is a pantropical flowering plant family of trees or shrubs, consisting of about 30 species in 3 or 4 genera. It is a broadleaf evergreen.

References

 
Malpighiales families
Pantropical flora